Sunderland Association Football Club is an English professional football club based in the city of Sunderland, Tyne and Wear. Formed in 1879, Sunderland play in the Championship, the second tier of English football. The club has won six top-flight titles (1892, 1893, 1895, 1902, 1913, and 1936) in the First Division, and has finished runners-up five times. The club has also won the FA Cup twice (1937 and 1973) and been runners-up twice (1913 and 1992), as well as winning the FA Charity Shield in 1936 and being finalists the following year. Sunderland have also been Football League Cup finalists in 1985 and 2014.

Between 1891 and 1939, "The Black Cats", as they are known - in addition to their six league titles - finished in the bottom half of the league only ten times, and finished in the top seven 28 times. Since World War II, their league performances have been considerably poorer, only finishing in the top half nine times, (1947, 1949, 1950, 1953, 1955, 1956, 2000, 2001 and 2011), and only reaching the top seven four times (1950, 1955, 2000 and 2001). Furthermore, they have been relegated eleven times, and just over half of this period has been spent in the top flight (41 out of 76 seasons); of the 35 seasons in which they were outside the top flight, five have been spent in the third tier.

Sunderland play their home games at the 49,000-capacity all-seater Stadium of Light having moved from Roker Park in 1997. The original ground capacity was 42,000 which was increased to 49,000 following expansion in 2000. The club has a long-standing rivalry with nearby club Newcastle United, with whom the Tyne–Wear derby has been contested since 1898. The club has played in red and white-striped shirts and black shorts for nearly the entirety of its history.

History

Early years and the "Team of All Talents" (1879–1908)
The club was founded as Sunderland and District Teachers A.F.C. by schoolmaster James Allan in what has commonly been believed to be October 1879. However, evidence suggests that the club was not formally created until a year later, on 25 September 1880. It was renamed as Sunderland A.F.C. and became open to more than just school teachers in October 1880.

Sunderland joined The Football League for the 1890–91 season. Tom Watson became Sunderland's first manager when he was appointed in 1888. During the late 19th century, they were declared the "Team of All Talents" by William McGregor, the founder of the league, after a 7–2 win against Aston Villa. Sunderland won the league championship in the 1891–92 season, one season after joining The Football League, and this performance led The Times to describe the players as "a wonderfully fine team". Sunderland successfully defended the title the following season, aided by their Scottish centre forward John Campbell, who broke the 30-goal mark for the second time in consecutive seasons. In the process, they became the first team to score 100 goals in a season, a feat not matched until 1919–20.

Sunderland came close to winning a third successive league championship in the 1893–94 season, finishing second behind Aston Villa. However, they regained the title in the 1894–95 season, with Campbell becoming league top scorer for the third time. Sunderland then beat Scottish champions Heart of Midlothian in a game described as the "World Championship" match. Their goalkeeper Ned Doig set a 19th-century world record by not conceding any goals in 87 of his 290 top division appearances (30%). From 1886 until 1898, Sunderland's home ground was in Newcastle Road. In 1898, the club moved to what would become their home for almost a century, Roker Park. Initially the ground had a capacity of 30,000.

After taking Sunderland to three English League championship titles manager Watson resigned at the end of the 1895–96 season, in order to join Liverpool. Robert Campbell replaced him. Campbell did not achieve the same playing success as Watson, as Sunderland failed to win any titles in his three seasons at the club.

Scotsman Alex Mackie replaced Campbell as manager for the 1899 season. Following a second-place finish in 1900–01, the club won their fourth league title in the 1901–02 season, and followed this up with victory in the Sheriff of London Charity Shield.

In December 1902, Arthur Bridgett joined Sunderland. He went on to captain the "Black Cats" for ten years and gain eleven England caps, making him the club's second most-capped England international behind Dave Watson.

Further league championship titles (1908–1945)

On 5 December 1908, Sunderland achieved their highest ever league win, 9–1 against north-east rivals Newcastle United. Under Irish manager Bob Kyle and with Scottish Charles Thomson as captain, the club won the league again in 1913, but lost their first FA Cup final 1–0 to Aston Villa.

Two seasons later the First World War brought the league to a halt. After the league's resumption, Sunderland came close to winning another championship in the 1922–23 season, when they were runners-up to Liverpool. They also came close the following season, finishing third. The club escaped relegation from the First Division by one point in the 1927–28 season despite 35 goals from Dave Halliday. 
Halliday improved his goal scoring to 43 goals in 42 games the following season, an all-time Sunderland record for goals scored in a single season.

The club's sixth league championship came in the 1935–36 season under Scottish manager Johnny Cochrane. They scored 109 goals during the season, with Raich Carter and Bobby Gurney each scoring 31. They followed this by winning the Charity Shield against FA Cup winners Arsenal.

Despite winning the league, the season did not go without tragedy. The young goalkeeper of the team, Jimmy Thorpe, died as a result of being kicked after he had picked up the ball following a backpass against Chelsea. He continued to take part until the match finished, but collapsed at home and died in hospital four days later. This incident led to a change in the rules, whereby players were no longer allowed to raise their foot to a goalkeeper when he had control of the ball in his arms.

They won the FA Cup the following season, after a 3–1 victory against Preston North End at Wembley Stadium. Some football was still played during the Second World War as a morale boosting exercise, in the form of the Football League War Cup. Sunderland were finalists in the tournament in 1942.

"The Bank of England" club, financial troubles and three cup finals (1945–1995)

For Sunderland, the immediate post-war years were characterised by significant spending; the club paid £18,000 (£ today) for Carlisle United's Ivor Broadis in January 1949. Broadis was also Carlisle's manager at the time, and this is the first instance of a player transferring himself to another club. This, along with record-breaking transfer fees to secure the services of Len Shackleton and the Welsh international Trevor Ford, led to a contemporary nickname, the "Bank of England club". The club finished third in the First Division in 1950, their highest finish since the 1936 championship.

The late 1950s saw a sharp downturn in Sunderland's fortunes, and the club was once again implicated in a major financial scandal in 1957. Found guilty of making payments to players in excess of the maximum wage, they were fined £5,000 (£ today), and their chairman and three directors were suspended. The following year, Sunderland were relegated from the highest division for the first time in their 68-year league history.
Sunderland's absence from the top flight lasted six years. After a close call in the previous season, the club was promoted to Division One in 1964 after finishing in second place. At the end of the decade, they were again relegated to the Second Division after finishing 21st.

Sunderland won their last major trophy in 1973, in a 1–0 victory over Don Revie's Leeds United in the FA Cup Final. A Second Division club at the time, Sunderland won the game thanks mostly to the efforts of their goalkeeper Jimmy Montgomery. Ian Porterfield scored a volley in the 30th minute to beat Leeds and take the trophy. Since 1973 only two other clubs, Southampton in 1976, and West Ham United in 1980, have equalled Sunderland's achievement of lifting the FA Cup while playing outside the top tier of English football.

By winning the FA Cup, Sunderland qualified for the UEFA Cup Winners' Cup, the club's only appearance in European competition to date. They beat Vasas Budapest but then lost on aggregate to Sporting of Portugal in the second round. After spending six seasons in the Second Division, Sunderland were promoted to Division One in the 1975–76 season, but were relegated again the following season, despite a late-season comeback which saw them win two matches 6–0 and 6–1.

Sunderland appeared in their first League Cup final in 1985, but lost 1–0 to Norwich City. In 1987, Sunderland saw one of the lowest points in their history, when they were relegated to the Third Division of the English league for the first time. Under new chairman Bob Murray and new manager Denis Smith, the club was promoted the following season. In 1990, they were promoted back to the top flight in unusual circumstances, losing to Swindon Town in the play-off final, but Swindon's promotion was revoked after the club was found guilty of financial irregularities and Sunderland were promoted instead. They stayed up for one year before being relegated on the final day of the following season.

Sunderland's next outing in a major final came in 1992 when, as a Second Division club, they returned to the FA Cup final. There was to be no repeat of the heroics of 1973, as Sunderland lost 2–0 to Liverpool.

New stadium, promotions and relegations (1995–2006)
In 1995, they faced the prospect of a return to the third-tier of English football. Peter Reid was brought in as manager, and quickly turned things around. Reid's time in charge had a stabilising effect; he remained manager for seven years. After promotion from Division One in the 1995–96 season, Sunderland began their first season in the Premier League, but finished third from the bottom and were relegated back to the First Division.

In 1997, Sunderland left Roker Park and moved to the Stadium of Light, a 42,000-seat arena that, at the time, was the largest stadium built in England after the Second World War. The capacity was later increased to 49,000.

Sunderland returned to the Premier League as First Division champions in 1999 with a then-record 105 points. At the end of the season Sunderland finished seventh, with Kevin Phillips winning the European Golden Shoe in his first top-flight season, scoring 30 goals.

Another seventh-place finish in the 2000–01 season was followed by two less successful seasons, and they were relegated to the second-tier with a then-record low 19 points in 2003. Former Ireland manager Mick McCarthy took over at the club, and, in 2005, he took Sunderland up as champions for the third time in less than 10 years. However, the club's stay in the top flight was short-lived as Sunderland were once again relegated, this time with a new record-low total of 15 points. McCarthy left the club in mid-season, and he was replaced temporarily by former Sunderland player Kevin Ball.

Drumaville Consortium takeover and Ellis Short era (2006–2016)

Following Sunderland's relegation from the Premier League, the club was taken over by the Irish Drumaville Consortium, headed by ex-player Niall Quinn, who appointed former Manchester United captain Roy Keane as the new manager. Under Keane, the club rose steadily up the table with an unbeaten run of 17 games to win promotion to the Premier League, Following an inconsistent start to the 2008–09 season, Keane resigned. Before the start of the following campaign, Irish-American businessman Ellis Short completed a full takeover of the club, and Steve Bruce was announced as the next manager on 3 June.

One of Bruce's first signings, Darren Bent, cost a club record fee of £10 million, broken a year later when they bought Ghana international Asamoah Gyan for around £13 million. Sunderland started the 2010–11 season strongly, but after Bent left for Aston Villa in January 2011 in a deal potentially worth £24 million, a record transfer fee received for the club, they eventually finished 10th — which was still their highest top-flight finish for 10 years. After being named Sunderland's Young Player of the Year for two seasons in a row, local player Jordan Henderson was transferred to Liverpool at the end of the 2010–11 season, where he went on to win the Champions League among other achievements.

Short replaced Quinn as chairman in October 2011, with Quinn initially becoming Director of International Development; he left the club with immediate effect in February 2012. Bruce was sacked in November 2011, and replaced by Martin O'Neill. O'Neill was sacked in March 2013 and Italian Paolo Di Canio was announced as his replacement the following day to widespread controversy. Sunderland went on to avoid relegation with one game to go. Di Canio was sacked after a poor start to the 2013–14 season, and reports of a complete breakdown in relations with his players. Gus Poyet was announced as his replacement, and led Sunderland to the 2014 Football League Cup Final, where they were defeated 3–1 by Manchester City. In March 2015 Poyet was sacked, and veteran Dutchman Dick Advocaat was appointed, saving the club from relegation. Eight games into the 2015–16 season he resigned from the position. Sam Allardyce was appointed the next manager in October 2015, and the club was again saved from relegation at the end of the season.

Divisional movements and ownership changes (2016–present)
In July 2016, Allardyce left the club to be announced as manager for the England national team, and David Moyes was appointed as his replacement. Under Moyes, Sunderland made the worst ever start to a Premier League season, taking just two points from their opening 10 matches. The club was relegated for the first time in 10 years at the end of 2016–17, finishing bottom of the table, and Moyes resigned. In June 2017, goalkeeper Jordan Pickford, a product of Sunderland's academy, was transferred to Everton for a fee of £25 million, rising to a possible £30 million; a record for a British goalkeeper.

Following relegation, Simon Grayson was announced as the new manager. The club made a very poor start to the 2017–18 EFL Championship season (which was documented in the Netflix series Sunderland 'Til I Die) and Grayson was sacked at the end of October, with Chris Coleman replacing him. In April 2018, after a second consecutive relegation, this time to League One, the club was sold to a group led by Stewart Donald and Coleman was released from his contract.

Jack Ross was appointed as the new manager in May 2018. In the club's first season in League One they got to the final of the EFL Trophy and finished 5th and reached the play-off final, but lost to Charlton Athletic at Wembley. After a disappointing start to the following 2019–20 season, Ross was sacked. He was replaced by former Bolton manager Phil Parkinson. Sunderland finished the season in 8th place, their lowest ever league position, with the final standings ultimately being determined by points per game due to football's suspension due to the COVID-19 pandemic.

Parkinson was sacked in November 2020 and was replaced by Lee Johnson the following month. Later that month, the club reached an agreement with Kyril Louis-Dreyfus for him to purchase a controlling stake in the club. The takeover was completed on 18 February 2021. In May 2021, the club again fell short of promotion after losing to Lincoln City 3–2 on aggregate in the semifinals of the play-offs, meaning that Sunderland would remain in the third tier for a fourth consecutive season.

In February 2022, former Norwich manager Alex Neil was appointed as head coach, following the dismissal of Lee Johnson after a 6–0 loss to Bolton in January. After finishing fifth in League One at the end of the season, Sunderland qualified for the playoffs. In the semi-finals, they beat Sheffield Wednesday 2–1 on aggregate, and went on to beat Wycombe Wanderers 2–0 in the final to secure a return to the second flight of English football, having languished in League One for four seasons.

Colours and crest
Sunderland played in an all blue strip from their formation until 1884, when they adopted a red and white halved strip. They assumed the current strip of red and white stripes in the 1887–88 season. Their badge included a ship, the upper part of the Sunderland coat of arms, a black cat, and a football in front of Sunderland's red and white stripes. In 1972 the badge was changed, removing the black cat but still including a ship, a football and the background of red and white stripes. This badge was first used on the match day shirt in 1977, replacing the simple black 'SAFC' initials which had been used since 1973. The top section and border of the badge was coloured in blue until 1991, when it changed to black.

To coincide with the move from Roker Park to the Stadium of Light in 1997, Sunderland released a new crest divided into four quarters; the upper right and lower left featured their traditional red and white colours, but the ship was omitted. The upper left section features the Penshaw Monument and the lower right section shows the Wearmouth Bridge. A colliery wheel at the top of the crest commemorates County Durham's mining history, and the land the Stadium of Light was built on, formerly the Monkwearmouth Colliery. The crest also contains two lions, the black cats of Sunderland, and a banner displaying the club's motto, Consectatio Excellentiae, which means "In pursuit of excellence".

Stadium

Sunderland have had eight grounds throughout their history; the first was at Blue House Field in Hendon in 1879. The ground was close to the place where Sunderland formed, at Hendon Board School; at that time the rent for use of the ground was £10 (£ today). The club then used a number of fields, one of which was near The Cedars road, before relocating to Groves Field in Ashbrooke in 1882 for one season. The club's third stadium was Horatio Street in Roker, the first Sunderland stadium north of the River Wear; the club played a single season there before another move, this time to Abbs Field in Fulwell for two seasons. Abbs Field was notable for being the first Sunderland ground to which they charged admission.

Sunderland moved to Newcastle Road in 1886. By 1898, the ground reached a capacity of 15,000 after renovations, and its rent had risen to £100 (£ today) a year. Near the turn of the 20th century, Sunderland needed a bigger stadium. They returned to Roker and set up home in Roker Park. It was opened on 10 September 1898, and the home team played a match the same day against Liverpool, which they won. The stadium's capacity increased to 50,000 after redevelopment with architect Archibald Leitch in 1913. Sunderland were nearly bankrupted by the cost of renovating the Main Stand, and Roker Park was put up for sale but no further action was taken. On 8 March 1933, an overcrowded Roker Park recorded the highest ever attendance at a Sunderland match, 75,118 against Derby County in a FA Cup sixth round replay. Roker Park suffered a bombing in 1943, in which one corner of the stadium was destroyed. A special constable was killed while patrolling the stadium. By the 1990s, the stadium was no longer large enough, and had no room for possible expansion. In January 1990, the Taylor Report was released after overcrowding at Hillsborough Stadium resulted in the deaths of 97 Liverpool fans. The report recommended that all major stadiums must be converted to an all-seater design. As a result, Roker Park's capacity was reduced. It was demolished in 1997 and a housing estate built in its place.

In 1997, Sunderland moved to their present ground, Stadium of Light in Monkwearmouth, which was opened by Prince Andrew, Duke of York. Built with an original capacity of 42,000, it hosted its first game against Dutch team Ajax. The stadium bears a similar name to the Portuguese club Benfica's ground Estádio da Luz, albeit in a different language. A stadium expansion in 2000 saw the capacity increase to 49,000. A Davy lamp monument stands outside the stadium, and a miners banner was presented to the club by the Durham Miners' Association, as a reminder of the Monkwearmouth Colliery pit the stadium was built on.

Supporters and rivalries

Attendance and following
The club has had a historically large and passionate following, with the club seeing attendance figures larger than other more fashionable clubs. For instance a 2019 by the International Centre for Sports Studies (CIES) showed that over the prior 5 seasons (2013 to 2018) Sunderland recorded the 38th highest average attendance in world football with an average of 39,249 fans at the Stadium of Light. Sunderland's average attendance were higher over that period than perennial title challengers such as Juventus F.C. in Italy and FC Porto in Portugal. Despite relegation from the Premier League in 2017 the club has continued to post large annual average attendance figures, recording over 30,000 for the 2019 and 2020 seasons, enough for 16th in the country. Following relegation from the Championship at the end of the 2017–18 season, Sunderland subsequently broke the League One division attendance record on 26 December 2018 in a match against Bradford City with a total of 46,039 fans.

Popular songs, music and chants
A song Sunderland fans sing every game and has been described as the anthem of the club is a rendition of "Can't Help Falling in Love" by Elvis Presley, with "Sunderland" being sung repeatedly after "but I can't help falling in love with you." Also, during Gus Poyet's tenure, Sunderland supporters started singing "Things Can Only Get Better" by D:Ream. The fans launched a campaign to get the song back into the charts, to coincide with their team's 2014 League Cup Final. A day after the Final, the song re-entered the UK Dance Chart at number 19.

Two of the most famous chants by Sunderland supporters are "I'm Sunderland till I die" and "We're by far the greatest team, the world has ever seen" — with the former being chosen as the title of the Netflix show Sunderland 'Til I Die. One of the oldest Sunderland chants is "Ha'way the lads" which was sung at Sunderland games as far back as the 1960s.

According to a YouGov poll in 2014, supporters of Sunderland showed a tendency towards left politics. They sometimes sing a version of "The Red Flag" during games.

Fanzines and fan produced material
The fans most enduring fanzine is A Love Supreme. The fanzine was first published in 1989 and has won several awards for best Fanzine. Since 2010 the online fanzine Roker Report has operated on the SB Nation blogging network. Roker Report has since grown in popularity amongst Sunderland fans, producing daily articles and interaction with fans. In 2016 Roker Report started a podcast called RokerRapport which has three or four episodes weekly. They occasionally interview current and former footballers, managers, owners and prominent fans of Sunderland. Since 2013 an independent podcast called Wise Men Say was created and was initially one episode weekly, however it has since grown in popularity and now does three episodes weekly. In 2021 we began publishing opinion pieces on wisemensay.co.uk with a team of writers producing a wide range of features and informative articles. And, in 2021, the Wise Men Say Podcast was nominated Club Podcast of the Year at the 2021 Football Supporters Association Awards. In 2022, Wise Men Say reached 2million downloads through its host platform Acast. The club also previously had an official monthly subscription magazine, called the Legion of Light, which season ticket holders received for no cost. Others in the past have been It's The Hope I Can't Stand, Sex and Chocolate, Wise Men Say, and The Roker Roar (later The Wearside Roar).

Supporters clubs and officially recognised organisations
According to the club there are over 70 branches of official Supporters' Clubs in England and around the world, including North Korea. The Official clubs are represented collectively by a Branch Liaison Council that was formed in the 1970s. In addition the club has had a SAFC Liaison Group (SLG) since 1994 that works with fans on club issues and an independent supporters group, the Red & White Army (RAWA).

Rivalries and close ties

Traditionally, Sunderland's two main rivals have been Newcastle United and Middlesbrough, against whom the Tyne–Wear derby and Tees–Wear derby are competed for respectively. Although both are generally geographically close, Newcastle are considered their main rivals. The club were rivals with fellow Sunderland-based team Sunderland Albion in the 1880s and 1890s, a breakaway club formed by Sunderland's founder James Allan, until the club was made defunct.

Sunderland also share good relations and a mutual friendship with Dutch club Feyenoord; this was developed after Wearside shipbuilders found jobs in Rotterdam during the 1970s and 80s. The club also has good relations and a mutual friendship with Norwich City, with matches between the two clubs being known as the Friendship Trophy, following good rapport in the 1985 Milk Cup final.

Charitable associations

In 2001, the chairman Bob Murray established the Foundation of Light charity, to help educational development through football, and offers learning centres in addition to scholarships. The organisation engaged 280 children within a year, and three years after foundation opened a £1.6m facility along with double-decker buses redeveloped as classrooms.

In popular culture
Sunderland were the subject, together with Aston Villa, of one of the earliest football paintings in the world – possibly the earliest – when in 1895 the artist Thomas M. M. Hemy painted a picture of a game between the teams at Sunderland's then ground Newcastle Road.

In 1973, comedian Bobby Knoxall recorded "Sunderland All the Way" for the 1973 FA Cup Final record.

In 1996, a group of Sunderland fans under the name Simply Red and White released a song called "Daydream Believer (Cheer Up Peter Reid)" to the melody of "Daydream Believer" dedicated to the manager Peter Reid. The song peaked at number 41 in the UK Singles & Album Chart. The fans recorded the song due to the fact the manager often had a dour demeanour, whilst the team was doing well, and even won promotion at the end of the season.

Sunderland were mentioned in the May 1997 State Opening of Parliament when Chris Mullin, MP for Sunderland South, stated in his seconding of Queen Elizabeth II's Gracious Speech:
Sunderland has been through hard times in the past, and has survived; as before, we will pick ourselves up, dust ourselves down and come out fighting. Sunderland looks to the future, not the past, and we shall soon be back in the Premier League.

In 1998 and following the demolition of Roker Park, playwright Tom Kelly and actor Paul Dunn created a one-man play called "I Left My Heart at Roker Park" about a fan struggling with the move and what Roker Park meant for him – the play originally ran in 1997, and has had a few revivals since.

In 1998, the BBC broadcast a six-part documentary named Premier Passions. It chronicled Sunderland's 1996–97 season, in which the club was relegated from the Premier League, the year after winning promotion from the Football League First Division, and the move to Stadium of Light.

In 2018, Netflix released an eight-part documentary called Sunderland 'Til I Die. It documented the events around Sunderland's 2017–18 season which saw them relegated from the EFL Championship. As a result of the success of the first series, a second season was confirmed, despite opposition from many club members. The opposition was mostly to do with players fearing the series would cause their failures being associated with them for the rest of their careers.

Nicknames

Sunderland's official nickname is "The Black Cats". The name was made official in a public vote in 2000. Despite the nickname being made official only relatively recently, the black cat has been used as an emblem of the club throughout most of its history. Photographs exist of players holding a black cat which made Roker Park its home in the 1900s and 1910s, and which was fed and watered by the football club. The club's first official badge featured a black cat sitting prominently in its centre and since the 1960s the emblem of the Sunderland A.F.C. Supporters Association has been a black cat. A Sunderland supporter, Billy Morris, took a black cat in his chest pocket as a good luck charm to the 1937 FA Cup final in which Sunderland brought home the trophy for the first time and reference has also been made to a "Black Cat Battery", an Artillery battery based on the River Wear during the Napoleonic Wars.

Before this when the team still played at Roker Park, they were known as the Rokerites. This was made obsolete after the club left Roker Park for the Stadium of Light in 1997. Other nicknames used by the media and include the Mackems (believed to be related to the ship building industry and a name for inhabitants of Sunderland) or the Wearsiders, as a reference to the river that the city and broader region of Wearside sits alongside, and in contrast to their Tyneside rivals Newcastle United.

As well as club nicknames, names have been used to define memorable periods in the club's history. The "Team of All Talents" moniker was used during Sunderland's successful period in the 1890s, and Sunderland were known as the "Bank of England club" during the 1950s. This was in reference to the club's spending in the transfer market at the time, which saw the transfer-record broken twice.

Statistics and records

The holder of the record for the most league appearances is Jimmy Montgomery, having made 527 first team appearances between 1961 and 1976. The club's top league goal scorer is Charlie Buchan, who scored 209 goals from 1911 to 1925; Bobby Gurney is the record goalscorer over all competitions with 228 goals between 1926 and 1939. Dave Halliday holds the record for the most goals scored in a season: 43 in the 1928–29 season in the Football League First Division. As of October 2014 John O'Shea is the most capped player for the club, making 100 appearances for the Republic of Ireland.

The club's widest victory margin in the league was in the 9–1 win against Newcastle United in the First Division in 1908. Sunderland's biggest ever win in the FA cup was against Fair field (a non-league team) and the final score was 11–1. Their heaviest defeats in the league were 8–0 against Sheffield Wednesday in 1911, West Ham United in 1968, Watford in 1982 and Southampton in 2014 Sunderland joined the top division in England, The Football League, in the 1890–91 season and were not relegated until 1957–58 (a span of 67 years, although 'only' 56 seasons, given that there was no league football between 1915 and 1919 due to World War I, nor between 1939 and 1946 due to World War II). In October 2015, Sunderland defeated rivals Newcastle United for the sixth consecutive time, a new record.

Sunderland's record home attendance is 75,200, set during a sixth round FA Cup replay against Derby County on 8 March 1933.

Record goalscorers 
Ten Sunderland players have scored 100 goals or more in league competitions. They are as follows:

Bobby Gurney holds the record number of goals in all competitions with a combined total of 228 in league and cup games.

Transfers
The biggest transfer fee Sunderland have ever received for one of their players is £30 million for Jordan Pickford, who moved to Everton in July 2017. This was also the biggest fee Sunderland have received for a player produced by the Sunderland academy. The biggest transfer fee paid by Sunderland is £13 million for Asamoah Gyan, who was bought from Rennes on 31 August 2010.

Overall
Seasons spent at Level 1 of the football league system: 86
Seasons spent at Level 2 of the football league system: 30
Seasons spent at Level 3 of the football league system: 5
Seasons spent at Level 4 of the football league system: 0
As of the 2021–22 season

Kit sponsorship

The first sponsor to appear on Sunderland kits was Cowie's, the business group of then chairman Tom Cowie, between 1983 and 1985. The club was sponsored by the Vaux Breweries between 1985 and 1999, with drink brands such as Lambtons sometimes appearing on kits. Subsequently, the club were sponsored by Sunderland car dealership company Reg Vardy from 1999 to 2007. Sunderland were sponsored by the Irish bookmaker Boylesports, who signed a four-year contract with the club in 2007 estimated to be worth £8 million. In April 2010, Sunderland signed a two-year shirt sponsorship deal with tombola, a local online bingo company. On 25 June 2012, Sunderland announced the strengthening of their partnership with the Invest in Africa initiative, with the initiative becoming the club's shirt sponsor for two years. The project is closely linked with Tullow Oil. However, after a year the club announced a new sponsorship deal with South African company Bidvest. On 1 June 2015 Sunderland announced a new sponsorship with Dafabet to appear on the kits for the following season.

The first kit manufacturer to appear on Sunderland kits was Umbro, between 1975 and 1981. French brand Le Coq Sportif produced kits between 1981 and 1983. Nike's first stint as kit manufacturer came between 1983 and 1986, before kits from Patrick (1986–88), Hummel (1988–94), Avec (1994–97) and Asics (1997–00). Nike returned between 2000 and 2004. Diadora produced kits for a solitary season, 2004–05, and Lonsdale made kits between 2005 and 2007. Umbro returned for five seasons between 2007 and 2012, before Adidas became the club's kit manufacturer for the first time in 2012. Nike then returned for a third time as Sunderland's kit manufacturer in 2020.

Players

First team squad

Out on loan

Notable players

Reserves and academy

Club officials

Coaching staff

Information correct as of 5 October 2022

Board of Directors

Information correct as of 22 June 2022

Honours
The following are the honours Sunderland have achieved since their foundation in 1879.

League
 First Division/Premier League (Tier 1)
 Winners (6): 1891–92, 1892–93, 1894–95, 1901–02, 1912–13, 1935–36
 Runners-up (5): 1893–94, 1897–98, 1900–01, 1922–23, 1934–35
 Second Division/First Division/Championship (Tier 2)
 Winners (5): 1975–76, 1995–96, 1998–99, 2004–05, 2006–07
 Promoted: 1963–64, 1979–80
 Play-off winners: 1989–901
 Third Division/Second Division/League One (Tier 3)
 Winners (1): 1987–88
 Play-off winners: 2021–22
1: Due to financial irregularities, Swindon Town (play-off Final winners) were prevented from taking their place in the top division, which was awarded to the losing finalists, Sunderland.

Cup
 FA Cup
 Winners: 1936–37, 1972–73
 Runners-up: 1912–13, 1991–92
 Football League Cup
 Runners-up: 1984–85, 2013–14
 EFL Trophy
 Winners: 2020–21
 Runners-up: 2018–19
 FA Charity Shield
 Winners: 1936
 Runners-up: 1937
 Sheriff of London Charity Shield
 Winners: 1903

Other
 BBC Sports Personality Team of the Year Award
 Winners: 1973
 Football World Championship
 Winners: 1892, 1893, 1895

References

Further reading

External links

 

 Sunderland AFC Statistics
 Sunderland play-off record 
 SAFC Stats and Season Reviews from 1890–1891 to date
 The last pass The role of football clubs in WW1 including Jimmy Seed

 
1879 establishments in England
Association football clubs established in 1879
FA Cup winners
EFL Trophy winners
Football clubs in England
Football clubs in Tyne and Wear
English Football League clubs
Premier League clubs
United Soccer Association imported teams
Mining association football teams in England
Sunderland